Chirine Knaidil (born 19 July 1994) is a Moroccan women's football defender.

She played in the 2017-18 Turkish Women's First League season for Beşiktaş J.K. appearing in eight matches of the league's second half and scored three goals.

She was called up to the Morocco women's national under-20 football team for preparation of the 2014 African U-20 Women's World Cup Qualifying Tournament. She scored her team's only goal in the match against Tunisia.

See also
List of Morocco women's international footballers

References

1994 births
Living people
People from Fez, Morocco
Moroccan women's footballers
Women's association football defenders
Beşiktaş J.K. women's football players
Morocco women's international footballers
Moroccan expatriate footballers
Moroccan expatriate sportspeople in Turkey
Expatriate women's footballers in Turkey